Qaleh-ye Sukhteh (also Romanized as Qal‘eh-ye Sūkhteh and Qal‘eh Sukhteh; also known as Qal‘eh-i-Sūkhtan and Sūkhteh) is a village in Angali Rural District, in the Central District of Bushehr County, Bushehr Province, Iran. At the 2006 census, its population was 279, in 56 families.

References 

Populated places in Bushehr County